Executive Order 9981 was issued on July 26, 1948, by President Harry S. Truman. This executive order abolished discrimination "on the basis of race, color, religion or national origin" in the United States Armed Forces, and led to the re-integration of the services during the Korean War (1950–1953). It was a crucial event in the post-World War II civil rights movement and a major achievement of Truman's presidency.

Before Executive Order 9981

Black Americans in the military worked under different rules that delayed their entry into combat. They had to wait four years before they could begin combat training while a white American would begin training within months of being qualified. The Air Corps was deliberately delaying the training of African Americans even though it needed more manpower (Survey and Recommendations). The Women's Army Corps (WAC) reenlistment program was open to black women, but overseas assignments were not.

Black soldiers stationed in Britain during World War II found the US military attempted to impose Jim Crow segregation on them even though Britain did not practice the racism found in the US. According to author Anthony Burgess, when pub owners in Bamber Bridge were told by the US military to segregate their facilities, they installed signs that read "Black Troops Only". One soldier commented: "One thing I noticed here and which I don’t like is the fact that the English don’t draw any color line. The English must be pretty ignorant. I can’t see how a white girl could associate with a negro."

In a 1945 survey conducted among 250 white officers and sergeants who had a colored platoon assigned to their company the following results were found: 77% of both officers and sergeants said they had become more favorable towards black soldiers after having a black platoon assigned to their company (no cases were found where someone said their attitude towards them had turned less favorable), 84% of officers and 81% of sergeants thought the black soldiers had performed very well in combat, only 5% of officers and 4% of sergeants thought that black infantry soldiers were not as good as white infantry soldiers, and 73% of officers and 60% of sergeants thought that black soldiers and white soldiers got along together very well. According to this particular survey there are no reasonable grounds for racial segregation in the armed forces.

Attempts to end discrimination 

In 1947, civil rights activist A. Philip Randolph, along with colleague Grant Reynolds, renewed efforts to end discrimination in the military, forming the Committee Against Jim Crow in Military Service and Training, later renamed the League for Non-Violent Civil Disobedience Against Military Segregation.
Truman's Order expanded on Executive Order 8802 by establishing equality of treatment and opportunity in the military for people of all races, religions, or national origins.

The order:

It is hereby declared to be the policy of the President that there shall be equality of treatment and opportunity for all persons in the armed services without regard to race, color, religion or national origin. This policy shall be put into effect as rapidly as possible, having due regard to the time required to effectuate any necessary changes without impairing efficiency or morale.

The order also established a committee to investigate and make recommendations to the civilian leadership of the military to implement the policy.

The order eliminated Montford Point as a segregated Marine boot camp. It became a satellite facility of Camp Lejeune.

Most of the actual enforcement of the order was accomplished by President Dwight D. Eisenhower's administration (1953–1961), including the desegregation of military schools, hospitals, and bases.  The last of the all-black units in the United States military was abolished in September 1954.

Kenneth Claiborne Royall, Secretary of the Army since 1947, was forced into retirement in April 1949 for continuing to refuse to desegregate the army nearly a year after President Truman's Order.

Fifteen years after Truman's order, on July 26, 1963, Secretary of Defense Robert McNamara issued Directive 5120.36 encouraging military commanders to employ their financial resources against facilities used by soldiers or their families that discriminated based upon sex or race.

In contravention to Truman's executive order, the United States complied with a non-public request from the Icelandic government not to station black soldiers on the US base in Keflavík, Iceland. The United States complied with the Icelandic request until the 1970s and 1980s when black soldiers began to be stationed in Iceland.

References

Further reading
 Alan L. Gropman, The Air Force Integrates, 1949–1964 (Office of Air Force History, 1986) 
 Jon E. Taylor, Freedom to Serve: Truman, Civil Rights, and Executive Order 9981 (Routledge, 2013)

External links

 Full text of Executive Order 9981  from the Harry S. Truman Presidential Library and Museum
 Integration of the Armed Forces, 1940–1965 (Defense Studies Series) by Morris J. MacGregor Jr., from the United States Army Center of Military History
  Blacks Must Wage Two Wars:' The Freeman Field Uprising & WWII Desegregation", Indiana Historical Bureau
 "Fighting Together in Korea"—episode of the BBC World Service's radio program The Documentary concerning the effects of Executive Order 9981

1948 in law
1948 in the United States
20th-century military history of the United States
African-American history between emancipation and the civil rights movement
African-American history of the United States military
9981
History of civil rights in the United States